The Pioneer Valley Interscholastic Athletic Conference (PVIAC) is a high school athletic conference in District 1 of the Massachusetts Interscholastic Athletic Association (MIAA).

Member schools

Current members
 Agawam High School
 Amherst Regional High School
 Athol High School
 Baystate Academy
 Belchertown High School
 Central High School
 Chicopee High School
 Chicopee Comprehensive High School
 High School of Commerce
 Duggan, John J. Academy
 Easthampton High School
 East Longmeadow High School
 Franklin Technical High School
 Frontier Regional High School
 Gateway Regional High School
 Granby High School (Massachusetts)
 Greenfield High School
 Hampden Charter School of Science
 Hampshire Regional High School
 Holyoke High School
 Hopkins Academy
 Longmeadow High School
 Ludlow High School
 Mahar Regional School
 McCann Technical High School
 Minnechaug Regional High School
 Mohawk Trail Regional High School
 Monson High School
 Northampton High School
 Palmer High School
 Pathfinder Regional Vocational Technical High School
 Pioneer Valley Chinese Immersion Charter School
 Pioneer Valley Christian School
 Pioneer Valley Regional School
 Pope Francis
 Putnam Vocational High School
 Renaissance School
 Sabis International Charter School
 High School of Science and Technology
 Smith Academy
 Smith Vocational and Agricultural High School
 South Hadley High School
 Southwick-Tolland Regional High School
 St. Marys High School
 Turners Falls High School
 Ware High School
 Westfield High School
 Westfield Technical Academy
 West Springfield High School

Sports

Football
Western Mass High School Football Champions are listed below:

Prior to the 2013 MIAA football realignment, Western Mass teams played each other for State rights. After the 2013 alignment Western Mass teams faced Central Mass teams to determine State Champion.

References

Massachusetts Interscholastic Athletic Association leagues